The following is a list of episodes for the British sitcom Trollied, which aired 71 episodes and 5 specials on Sky One from 4 August 2011 to 23 December 2018.

Series overview

Episodes

Series 1 (2011)

Series 2 (2012)

Series 3 (2013)

Series 4 (2014)

Series 5 (2015)

Series 6 (2016)

Series 7 (2018)

Christmas Special (2018)
On 23 August 2018, it was announced that Trollied would end with a final Christmas special in December 2018. The episode was commissioned in order to give the series a proper finale.

References

External links
 
 List of 

Lists of British sitcom episodes